Serena Fang is a Taiwanese actress and model.

Filmography

Television series

Film

Music video

References

External links
 
 Serena Fang Facebook.
 WRETCH Blog.

1984 births
Living people
Taiwanese film actresses
Taiwanese television actresses
21st-century Taiwanese actresses